Nantang may refer to:

Southern Tang (南唐), a 10th-century Chinese state during the Five Dynasties and Ten Kingdoms period
Nantang, Lufeng, Guangdong (南塘) in China
Nantang, Gaozhou (南塘) also in Guangdong, China
Cathedral of the Immaculate Conception, Beijing, or Nantang (南堂), a Roman Catholic church in Beijing, China
Na'vi term for viperwolf in Avatar